The third season of American animated television series Regular Show, created by J. G. Quintel, originally aired on Cartoon Network in the United States. Quintel created the series' pilot using characters from his comedy shorts for the canceled anthology series The Cartoonstitute. He developed Regular Show from his own experiences in college. Simultaneously, several of the show's main characters originated from his animated shorts 2 in the AM PM and The Naïve Man from Lolliland. Following its second season's success, Regular Show was renewed for a third season on November 16, 2010, ahead of its second-season premiere. The season ran from September 19, 2011 to September 3, 2012, and was produced by Cartoon Network Studios.

Regular Shows third season was storyboarded and written by Quintel, Sean Szeles, Kat Morris, Benton Connor, Calvin Wong, Ben Adams, Andres Salaff, John Infantino, Toby Jones, Hilary Florido, Mike Roth, and Madeline Queripel.
For this season, the writers were Quintel, Roth, Infantino, Michele Cavin, and Matt Price, who is also the story editor.

Development

Concept
Two 23-year-old friends, a blue jay named Mordecai and a raccoon named Rigby, are employed as groundskeepers at a park and spend their days trying to slack off and entertain themselves by any means. This is much to the chagrin of their boss Benson and their coworker Skips, but the delight of Pops. Their other coworkers, Muscle Man (an overweight green man) and Hi-Five Ghost (a ghost with a hand extending from the top of his head) serve as their rivals.

Production
Many of the characters are loosely based on those developed for Quintel's student films at California Institute of the Arts: The Naive Man From Lolliland and 2 in the AM PM. Quintel pitched Regular Show for Cartoon Network's Cartoonstitute project, in which the network allowed artists to create pilots with no notes to be optioned as a show possibly. After being green-lit, Quintel recruited several indie comic book artists to compose the show's staff, as their style matched close to what he desired for the series. The season was storyboarded and written by Quintel, Sean Szeles, Kat Morris, Benton Connor, Calvin Wong, Ben Adams, Andres Salaff, John Infantino, Toby Jones, Hilary Florido, Mike Roth, and Madeline Queripel. For this season, the writers were  Quintel, Roth, Infantino, Michele Cavin, and Matt Price, who is also the story editor while being produced by Cartoon Network Studios.

The third season of Regular Show was produced between November 2010 and August 2011. It utilizes double entendres and mild language; Quintel stated that, although the network wanted to step up from the more child-oriented fare, some restrictions came with this switch.

Episodes

Home media
Warner Home Video released multiple DVDs, consisting of Region 1 formats.  The Best DVD in the World *At this Moment in Time, Party Pack, Fright Pack, Mordecai & Margaret Pack, Rigby Pack, and Mordecai Pack were created for Region 1 markets containing episodes from the third season.

Full season release
The full season set was released on DVD on June 17, 2014.

References

2011 American television seasons
2012 American television seasons
Regular Show seasons